"Tougher Than Nails" is a song written by Phil O'Donnell, Kendell Marvel and Max T. Barnes, and recorded by American country music artist Joe Diffie.  It was released in May 2004 as the first single and title track from the album Tougher Than Nails.  The song reached number 19 on the Billboard Hot Country Singles & Tracks chart, becoming Diffie's last hit on that chart.

Chart performance

References

2004 singles
Joe Diffie songs
Songs written by Max T. Barnes
Songs written by Kendell Marvel
Songs written by Phil O'Donnell (songwriter)
Song recordings produced by Buddy Cannon
BBR Music Group singles
2004 songs